This mathematics-related list provides Mubarakzyanov's classification of low-dimensional real Lie algebras, published in Russian in 1963. It complements the article on Lie algebra in the area of abstract algebra.

An English version and review of this classification was published by Popovych et al. in 2003.

Mubarakzyanov's Classification 

Let  be -dimensional Lie algebra over the field of real numbers
with generators , . For each algebra  we adduce only non-zero commutators between basis elements.

One-dimensional 
 , abelian.

Two-dimensional 
 , abelian ;
 , solvable ,

Three-dimensional 
 , abelian, Bianchi I;
 , decomposable solvable, Bianchi III;
 , Heisenberg–Weyl algebra, nilpotent, Bianchi II,
 
 , solvable, Bianchi IV,
 
 , solvable, Bianchi V,
 
 , solvable, Bianchi VI, Poincaré algebra  when ,
 
 , solvable, Bianchi VII,
 
 , simple, Bianchi VIII, 
 
 , simple, Bianchi IX, 
 

Four-dimensional 
 , abelian;
 , decomposable solvable,
 
 , decomposable solvable,
 
 , decomposable nilpotent,
 
 , decomposable solvable,
 
 , decomposable solvable,
 
 , decomposable solvable,
 
 , decomposable solvable,
 
 , unsolvable,
 
 , unsolvable,
 
 , indecomposable nilpotent,
 
 , indecomposable solvable,
 
 , indecomposable solvable,
 
 , indecomposable solvable,
 
 , indecomposable solvable,
 
 , indecomposable solvable,
 
 , indecomposable solvable,
 
 , indecomposable solvable,
 
 , indecomposable solvable,
 
 , indecomposable solvable,
 

Notes

References 
 
 

Lie algebras
Mathematics-related lists
Mathematical classification systems